The National University of Austral Patagonia   is an Argentine national university in Santa Cruz Province. The university is divided into four campuses, located in the cities of Caleta Olivia (UACO), Río Gallegos (UARG), San Julián (UASJ) and Río Turbio (UART), and was founded in 1995, by national law 24.446.

See also
Science and Education in Argentina
Argentine Higher Education Official Site 
 Argentine Universities

External links

Austral Patagonia
Educational institutions established in 1995
Universities in Santa Cruz Province, Argentina
1995 establishments in Argentina